Nisenan (or alternatively, Neeshenam, Nishinam, Pujuni, or Wapumni) is a nearly extinct Maiduan language spoken by the Nisenan people of central California in the foothills of the Sierras, in the whole of the American, Bear and Yuba river drainages.

Ethnologue states that there is only one speaker left. However, it is believed that there are a few other speakers left, although the number is not known. Most speakers also speak one or more of the different dialects.

There has recently been a small effort at language revival. Most notably the release of the "Nisenan Workbook" (three volumes so far) put out by Alan Wallace, which can be found at the California State Indian Museum in Sacramento and the Maidu Interpretive Center in Roseville.

As the Nisenan (like many of the Natives of central California) were not a unified nation but a collection of independent tribes which are grouped together primarily on linguistic similarity, there were many dialects to varying degrees of variation. This has led to some degree of inconsistency in the available linguistic data, primarily in regard to the phonemes.

Phonology 
The phonology of Nisenan is similar to both Konkow and Maidu.  Taking into account the various dialects, there appears to be a fair amount of allophones across the dialects.

Consonants 

The single affricate consonant has been most commonly described as alveolar , though some sources describe it as postalveolar . According to the Nisenan Workbook by Alan Wallace,  and  appear in complementary distribution. For example, the word for 'ten' is transcribed as 'maacam' (/c/ being realized as ) in Workbook #1 and 'maatsam' in Workbook #2.

 have been listed as ejectives (lenis ejectives according to "Central Hill Nisenan Texts with Grammatical Sketch" by Andrew Eatough) while other sources have labeled them simply as emphatic not specifying further as to how they contrast with the plain plosives. The Nisenan Workbooks depict these in transcription, though the sound guides have yet to distinguish them from the plain plosives.

One source noted an audible click with /b/ and /d/ among some older speakers of at least one dialect of one of the Maiduan languages. The sound guides in the Nisenan Workbooks hold /b/ and /d/ as voiced plosives as in English.

Some words have a double consonant (i.e. wyttee [one], dappe [coyote], konna [girl]) but it has not been made clear as to whether this is due to gemination as the double consonants in Japanese, or just simply the same consonant being on the end of one syllable and the start of the next.

Vowels 
All vowels come in long/short pairs

Long vowels are indicated by a doubling of the vowel.

 is sometimes further back, closer to cardinal 

Numbers 

Note: Due to dialectal variation from tribe to tribe, some sources may have different words. These are taken from the Nisenan Workbooks.

 1 = wyttee
 2 = peen
 3 = sap'yj
 4 = cyyj
 5 = maawyk
 6 = tymbo
 7 = top'yj
 8 = peencyyj
 9 = peli'o
 10 = maacam

 11 = maacam na wyttee (lit. 10 and 1 or 10+1; 'na' = +/and)
 12 = maacam na peen (etc. for 13 and up)

 20 = peenmaacam (lit. 2 10 or 2x10)
 30 = sap'yjmaacam (etc. for 40 and up)

 100 = maawykhaapa

See also

 Nisenan
 Maidu
 Maiduan languages

References

External links
 Maidu Interpretive Center: 
 Nisenan Workbook excerpts with audio clips 
Nisenan language overview at the Survey of California and Other Indian Languages
OLAC resources in and about the Nisenan language

Bibliography

 Campbell, Lyle. (1997). American Indian languages: The historical linguistics of Native America. New York: Oxford University Press. .
 Eatough, Andrew. (1999). Central Hill Nisenan Texts with Grammatical Sketch. Berkeley: UC Publications in Linguistics, 132.
 Heizer, Robert F. (1966). Languages, territories, and names of California Indian tribes.
 Mithun, Marianne. (1999). The languages of Native North America. Cambridge: Cambridge University Press.  (nsz); .
 Wallace, Alan. (2008). Nisenan Workbook #1 & #2.

Maiduan languages
Indigenous languages of California
Endangered Maiduan languages